Cuenca Province was a province of Gran Colombia. With the 1824 reform of the subdivisions of Gran Colombia it became part of the Azuay Department.

Provinces of Gran Colombia